Castelluccio dei Sauri is a historically Arbëreshë town and comune in the province of Foggia in the Apulia region of southeast Italy.

References

Cities and towns in Apulia
Arbëresh settlements